The Woman with That Certain Something (German: Die Frau mit dem Etwas) is a 1925 German silent film directed by Erich Schönfelder and starring Rudolf Lettinger, Lee Parry and Bruno Kastner.

The film's sets were designed by the art director Kurt Richter. It was shot at the Johannisthal Studios in Berlin.

Cast
Rudolf Lettinger as Walter Zug  
Lee Parry as Lu 
Bruno Kastner as Felix Müller  
Fritz Schulz as Gustav Lenz  
Dina Gralla as Erna Steinke
Margarete Kupfer as Lieschen Klumpp, the widow
Wilhelm Bendow as Günther Brandt 
Hans Stürm as Don Miguel di Calvarezzo 
Robert Garrison as Jean Manulescu  
Hugo Werner-Kahle as a tattooed gentleman 
Josef Commer as Der Gemeindevorsteher  
Hermann Picha as Piefke  
Karl Harbacher as Pafke  
Trude Hesterberg

References

External links

Films of the Weimar Republic
Films directed by Erich Schönfelder
German silent feature films
German black-and-white films
Films shot at Johannisthal Studios